Asa or Assa (Kazakh: Аса) is a railway station in Jambyl Region, Kazakhstan. It is used for freight trains.

References 

Railway stations in Kazakhstan